The Mermaid  is a 1965 Hong Kong Huangmei opera film. It was directed by Kao Li and produced by Shaw Brothers Studio, based on Yulan Ji.

Like most Huangmei opera films that she starred in, actress Ivy Ling Po portrayed a male character. Her co-star Li Ching portrayed two different characters, a human girl and a carp who transformed into her image.

Synopsis 
Zhang Zhen's family had fallen on hard times but remembering the betrothal agreement between his father and the prime minister, Master Chin, he set off for his fiance's home. When he arrived, he was distressed to receive a cold reception from his future father-in-law, who looked down on him because he was poor and was willing to fulfill his promise only after Zhang Zhen had successfully become the top scholar. He bade Zhang Zhen to stay at the Green Waves Study and prepare.

After a year, Zhang Zhen still had not achieved the status of top scholar. His pampered and spoiled betrothed, Peony, after the initial introduction had already forgotten about him. All he had for a companion, were the carp and the denizens of the pond by the study. The carp spirit was touched by his care for the fish and his loneliness. She visited him one winter's night in the guise of Peony and was further impressed with his sensitive and gentlemanly considerations for her well being. She managed to persuade him that she was of like mind with his philosophies, acknowledging their betrothal and her support in his endeavors. Thus a relationship was formed.

One night in spring, during the lantern festival, Zhang Zhen mistook the real Peony for his beloved and was rebuffed. Her father promptly threw him out. Shocked by his beloved's turn-about, enraged by the betrayal, disgusted with the materialistic and sanctimonious unprincipled attitudes of both father and daughter, he stormed off to return home. The carp spirit went after him and convinced him of her sincerity, telling him too that she was with child. Both decided to return to Zhang Zhen's home, 300 miles away. They attended the lantern festivities along their journey and were seen by Peony's father who thought Zhang Zhen had committed the worst of sins.

When two Peonies appeared, the household was thrown into an uproar. Even the righteous Judge Pao could not come to a settlement. Finally, the father summoned an exorcist to chase away the evil spirit. The carp spirit hastily released Zhang Zhen from the shed where he was imprisoned and convinced him to run away with her. However, they were beset by the Celestial Generals and gods who were summoned to subdue her. In despair, she told Zhang Zhen the truth and was gratified when he vowed to stay by her. Just as she was about to be killed, the Goddess of Mercy intervened. The carp spirit was given two choices, return with the Goddess to continue her training to be an immortal or forsake all her powers and become human.

Cast and Characters

Mortals
Ivy Ling Po as Zhang Zhen
Li Ching as Jin Mudan
Yang Chih-ching as Jin Chong
Ouyang Sha-fei as Jin Chong's wife
Yip Ching as Chunlan
Yam Ho as Jincai
Ching Miao as Bao Zheng
Fung Ngai as Wang Chao
Lan Wei-lieh as Ma Han
Kwan Yan as Zhang Long
Leung Yui as Zhao Hu

Mythical Characters
Li Ching as Carp Spirit 
Chiang Kuang-chao as Turtle Spirit
Tang Ti as Crab Spirit
Han Ying-chieh as Prawn Spirit
Shirley Wong as Snail Spirit
Chen Yun-hua as Goddess of Mercy

Original Soundtrack
The singing was performed by Ivy Ling Po, Tsin Ting and Liu Yun.

Awards and nominations
12th Asian Film Festival (1965)
Best Actress: Li Ching
The Most Versatile Talent Award: Ivy Ling Po
Best Sound Recording: Wang Yung-hua

External links 

Trailer with English subtitles

1965 films
Hong Kong musical films
1960s Mandarin-language films
Shaw Brothers Studio films
Fictional depictions of Bao Zheng in film
Films about mermaids
Huangmei opera films
Films directed by Kao Li
Hong Kong fantasy drama films